Priscilla Jones Lawson (née Shortridge, March 8, 1914 – August 27, 1958), was an American actress best known for her role as Princess Aura in the original Flash Gordon serial (1936).

Early years
Born in St. Paul, Indiana, Lawson was the daughter of Elmer Shortridge, a railroad yard foreman and machinist, and his wife, Elizabeth Shortridge née Hess.

Career 
Lawson was a professional model by her early twenties and was named Miss Miami Beach in 1935, after which she was employed as an Earl Carroll chorus girl at the Miami Casino. This gained her a contract with Universal Studios, which used her in a variety of small roles. However, in 1936 she was cast in the serial Flash Gordon as the voluptuous daughter of the villain, Ming the Merciless. Princess Aura's rivalry with Dale Arden for Flash Gordon's affection was one of the centerpieces of the serial and gained Lawson cult figure status.

Roy Kinnard wrote in Science Fiction Serials that "Lawson's notable physical assets were responsible for incurring the wrath of censors" in the filming of Flash Gordon. Co-star Jean Rogers told him that censors ordered retakes of Chapter 1 of the serial with Lawson "wearing slightly less revealing garb."

Her screen career ended in 1941.

Personal life 
Lawson was married to:
Gerald A. Lawson (1906-1933), a furniture salesman, on 8 March 1932; he died the following year of croupous pneumonia.
Alan Curtis (1909-1953), an American movie star, in November 1937. They divorced in 1940.

Later life 
After her second marriage ended, Lawson enlisted in the Women's Army Corps during World War II. An unverified rumor claims she lost a leg in an accident while serving in the Army. Another version is that she lost a leg in a 1937 car crash. However, her Flash Gordon co-star Jean Rogers denied that Lawson had lost a leg, and it was also rejected in a biographical review in an Indianapolis journal.

In later life, she managed a stationery shop in Los Angeles, California, and worked for two pottery companies as a finisher.

Death 

On August 27, 1958, Lawson died at 44 in Monrovia, California, due to cirrhosis and upper gastrointestinal bleeding caused by a duodenal ulcer. She was interred at Live Oak Memorial Park in Monrovia.

Filmography

References

External links
 
 
 Priscilla Lawson in a clip from the Flash Gordon serial from YouTube

1914 births
1958 deaths
American film actresses
Film serial actresses
Actresses from Indianapolis
Deaths from ulcers
20th-century American actresses